Christopher Geidner is an American journalist and blogger. He is the former legal editor at the online news organization BuzzFeed News, and, as of January 2022, is the Deputy Editor for Legal Affairs at Grid News.

Background

Geidner's first job in journalism was as a copy editor and editorial writer at the Tribune-Chronicle in Warren, Ohio. Later, he went to law school at the Moritz College of Law at The Ohio State University, where he served as Editor-in-Chief of the Ohio State Law Journal. After passing the bar in Ohio, Geidner practiced law at Porter, Wright, Morris and Arthur and worked as Ohio's principal assistant attorney general.

In 2009, Geidner turned his focus to the blog "Law Dork".  His writing launched him into a position at Metro Weekly, as a senior political writer. While at Metro Weekly, he was awarded for his coverage of the repeal of “Don't Ask, Don't Tell” (National Lesbian and Gay Journalists Association Excellence in Writing Award 2011) and the history of the Defense of Marriage Act (Gay and Lesbian Alliance Against Defamation  Outstanding Magazine award).

Geidner started covering national LGBT political and legal issues for BuzzFeed in 2012 as a senior political reporter. He was named the Sarah Pettit LGBT Journalist of the Year by the National Lesbian and Gay Journalists Association in 2012 and the Journalist of the Year in 2014.

In 2019, Geidner left BuzzFeed News and announced he would be joining The Justice Collaborative to work on criminal justice issues.

In April 2021, Geidner began writing columns at MSNBC.

See also
 Editorial board
 Literature review
 Political analysis

References

External links
 Chris Geidner at BuzzFeed
 Law Dork

American male journalists
Living people
American LGBT journalists
Ohio State University Moritz College of Law alumni
BuzzFeed people
Year of birth missing (living people)
21st-century LGBT people